The 2020–21 Ferrari Challenge Europe is the 28th season of Ferrari Challenge Europe and its predecessor Ferrari Challenge Italy. The season consists of 7 rounds, starting at the Autodromo Enzo e Dino Ferrari on 4 July 2020 and ending at the Misano World Circuit on 7 March 2021.

Michelle Gatting became the first woman to win a race outright in the Pro Class of the Trofeo Pirelli across all Ferrari Challenge championships worldwide in the first race of the sixth round at Misano.

Calendar

Entry list
All teams and drivers used the Ferrari 488 Challenge Evo fitted with Pirelli tyres.

Trofeo Pirelli

Coppa Shell

Results and standings

Race results

Championship standings
Points were awarded to the top ten classified finishers as follows:

Trofeo Pirelli

Coppa Shell

References

External links
 Official website

Europe 2020
Ferrari Challenge Europe
Ferrari Challenge Europe
Ferrari Challenge Europe
Ferrari Challenge Europe